"Flying Easy Loving Crazy" (stylized as "FLYING EASY LOVING CRAZY") is a song recorded by Japanese singer-songwriter Toshinobu Kubota and Japanese singer Misia for Kubota's fifteenth studio album Timeless Fly. It was released by Mastersix Foundation as the album's second single on March 26, 2008.

Background
"Flying Easy Loving Crazy" is the second in a series of collaborative singles released by Kubota. The song, which features guest vocals by Japanese singer Misia, whom Kubota has worked with in the past on the album Singer for Singer (2004), was written, composed and produced by Kubota and arranged by Daisuke Mori. It was used in the promotional campaign of the Cirque du Soleil production Dralion, dubbed Daihatsu Dralion in Japan. Kubota describes "Flying Easy Loving Crazy" as "courage, freedom, and colorfulness bloomed into a love song." In a press release, Misia commented that "during recording, it felt like Kubota's unique rhythm and melodies had opened up the doors to a new world." Kubota and Misia performed the song together twice at Misia's two-date Take Action! benefit concert tour, held at the Yokohama Blitz on May 26–27, 2008.

Chart performance
"Flying Easy Loving Crazy" entered the daily Oricon Singles Chart at number 10 and debuted at number 18 on the weekly chart, with 6,000 copies sold in its first week. The single charted for six weeks and sold a reported total of 11,000 copies.

Track listing

Charts

References

2008 singles
2008 songs
Misia songs
Toshinobu Kubota songs
Male–female vocal duets
Songs written by Toshinobu Kubota
Mastersix Foundation singles